Maiola Kalili (November 3, 1909 – August 23, 1972) was an American competition swimmer who represented the United States at the 1932 Summer Olympics in Los Angeles, California.  Kailili received a silver medal as a member of the second-place U.S. team in the men's 4×200-meter freestyle relay, together with teammates Frank Booth, George Fissler and Manuella Kalili, who was also his younger brother.

See also
 List of Olympic medalists in swimming (men)

References

External links
 
 

1909 births
1972 deaths
American male freestyle swimmers
Native Hawaiian sportspeople
Olympic silver medalists for the United States in swimming
Swimmers from Honolulu
Swimmers at the 1932 Summer Olympics
Medalists at the 1932 Summer Olympics